A bowl cut or mushroom cut is a simple haircut where the front hair is cut with a straight fringe (see bangs) and the rest of the hair is left longer, the same length all the way around, or else the sides and back are cut to the same short length. It is named so because in medieval times, when it was popular in Europe, a bowl would be placed on the head and then used as a cutting guide to trim the hair.

History

Historically, the bowl cut was popular among common European and Asian men, being an easy neat cut done by a non-professional. Indeed, it was done by putting a cooking pot of a fit size to the level of ears, and all hair below the rim was cut or shaved off. In some cultures it was a normal type of haircut. In other cultures the bowl cut was viewed as an attribute of poverty, signifying that the wearer could not afford to visit a barber.

In the 1960s the bowl cut made a return in popularity, in part due to celebrities such as the Beatles.

21st century
In the United States, the bowl cut was never particularly popular. At least as far back as the 1980’s, the cut has been ridiculed by many and is often mocked via internet memes.

By 2015, the hairstyle was uncommon enough that its use by mass murderer Dylann Roof was considered mildly noteworthy. The Anti-Defamation League has documented its metonymic use by young white supremacists, among whom it represents Roof and his crimes in particular, and white supremacist ideology in general.

See also
 List of hairstyles
 Pageboy
 Curtained hair
 Czupryna
 Moe Howard

References

 
 

Asian-American culture
Hairstyles